An election to Essex County Council took place on 9 May 2005 as part of the 2005 United Kingdom local elections. 75 councillors were elected from various electoral divisions, which returned either one or two county councillors each by first-past-the-post voting for a four-year term of office. The electoral divisions were redrawn for this election.

The Conservative Party retained control with an increased majority, winning 52 of the 75 seats. Labour and the Liberal Democrats both lost seats.

Previous composition

2001 election

Composition of council seats before election

Results

|-bgcolor=#F6F6F6
| colspan=2 style="text-align: right; margin-right: 1em" | Total
| style="text-align: right;" | 75
| colspan=5 |
| style="text-align: right;" |  
| style="text-align: right;" | 
|-
|}

Election of Group Leaders

Paul White (Stock) was re elected leader of the Conservative Group, Tom Smith-Hughes (Chelmsford North) was elected leader of the Liberal Democratic Group and Paul Kirkman (Pitsea) was elected leader of the Labour Group.

Election of Leader of the Council

Paul White the leader of the conservative group was duly elected leader of the council and formed a conservative administration.

Results by District

Basildon

District summary

Division results

Between 2001 and 2005, the seat was won by the Liberal Democrats candidate in a by-election, however it is shown as a hold as it is compared to the previous full council election.

Braintree

District summary

Division results

Brentwood

District summary

Division results

Castle Point

District summary

Division results

Chelmsford

District summary

Division results

Colchester

District summary

Division results

Epping Forest

District summary

Division results

Harlow

District summary

Division results

Maldon

District summary

Division results

Rochford

District summary

Division results

Tendring

District summary

Division results

Uttlesford

District summary

Division results

By-elections

Brentwood Rural

 
 

 

No UKIP (6.4%) or Green (3.1%) candidates as previous.

References

Essex County Council elections
2005 English local elections
2000s in Essex